"I Had a Love" was the second single released by the band Blue Angel from their 1980 album, also titled Blue Angel. Released either with the picture sleeve above or in a generic sleeve, it uniquely featured a different B-side in each country that saw its release. It did not chart successfully in any of these countries though it received moderate radio play.

7" vinyl track listing (United Kingdom) 
Length: 5 min 24 sec

Personnel
 Lyrics: Cyndi Lauper and John Turi. Production: Roy Halee. 
 Lyrics: Cyndi Lauper and John Turi. Production: Roy Halee.

7" vinyl track listing (Holland) 
Length: 5 min 32 sec'

Personnel
 Lyrics: Cyndi Lauper and John Turi. Production: Roy Halee. 
 Lyrics: Cyndi Lauper and John Turi. Production: Roy Halee.

7" vinyl track listing (Australia) 
Length: 5 min 29 sec

Personnel
 Lyrics: Cyndi Lauper and John Turi. Production: Roy Halee. 
 Lyrics: Cyndi Lauper and John Turi. Production: Roy Halee.

7" vinyl track listing (U.S.) 
Length: 5 min 23 sec

Personnel
 Lyrics: Cyndi Lauper and John Turi. Production: Roy Halee. 
 Lyrics: Cyndi Lauper and John Turi. Production: Roy Halee.

External links 
 Official Cyndi Lauper website

1980 singles
Cyndi Lauper songs
Blue Angel (band) songs
Songs written by Cyndi Lauper
Songs written by John Turi
Song recordings produced by Roy Halee
1980 songs
Polydor Records singles